Kanakana Kindi or Kanaka's Window is a small peephole in the Udupi Sri Krishna temple through which the great Indian saint Kanaka Dasa was given darshan by lord Krishna.

History
There are many popular legends regarding Lord Krishna's revelation to saint Kanaka Dâsa. We can unravel the mystery of this episode on the basis of the available historical documents. Kanaka Dâsa came to Udupi as a pilgrim to Have darshan with his Devotion to Istadevaru Lord Sri krishna. Sri Vâdirâja Tîrtha knew about this pious devotee of the Lord, and made arrangements for his stay in a hut in the roadside in front of the temple. Kanaka Dâsa used to play on his tambura and sing in the hut, but the wall of the temple was there between the icon and himself. Being of a lower caste, by tradition he was forbidden to enter the temple and have darshana of Sri Krishna. The wall of the shrine was, of course, a barrier to the physical eyes, but who could prevent the vision of his inner eyes? They were fully open and the Sri Krishna was visible to Kanaka Dâsa.   

Some time passed and then one night when kanakadasa willingness and desire to have Darshan of Lord Sri krishna there was an earthquake from gods grace and a small crack appeared in the wall of the shrine then Lord Krishna turned from east to west to give darshana to Great saint Sri Kanakadasa (Remember every Hindu temple gods is east faced, Lord Krishna himself turned towards west to appease Sri Kanakadasa) . Through this crack Kanaka Dâsa was able to have darshana of the icon of Krishna. Sri Vâdirâja Tîrtha became aware of this crack and of the fact that Kanaka Dâsa was using it to have darshana of Sri Krishna. Instead of having the crack plastered over, Sri Vâdirâja enlarged it and turned it into a window. To commemorate Lord Krishna's darshana to Kanaka Dâsa, the window has been designated as KANAKANA KINDI (Kanaka's window) 

Indian temples and the idols within the temples usually face East. The Udupi Krishna temple is an exception, visitors enter from the East go around to get a Darshan of the idol which faces West. Legend has it that the temple idol originally faced East but the idol turned and the Western wall cracked as the lord Sri Krishna wished to appease, Please  a devotee  - Kanakadasa Pure Devotion who was not allowed to enter the temple because he belonged to a lower caste Kuruba Gowda (Shepherds community). A window exists where the wall cracked and the idol is visible from the window. Every cast, sects lower middle cast's every one is allowed from then the great kanakadasa existence to have Lord Sri Krishna darshana.  

From that time onward, Kanaka Dâsa could have the darshana of Sri Krishna with his physical eyes as well as his inner eye. To perpetuate this sacred memory, the tradition of looking at the icon of Sri Krishna through this window before entering the shrine was started. 

Not only pilgrims, but even the piiThaadhipati-s of the eight Mutts who go to take charge of the temple at the time of paryaaya come in procession to this window. It is only after looking at the icon through this window that they enter the shrine. This tradition has been going on since the time of Sri Vâdirâja.

The Window
It is believed that Sri Vadiraja Swami set up a window to commemorate this divine event. This window, with a trellis work of peep-holes is popularly known as Kanakana kindi (Kanaka's window). Peeping through this window, a pilgrim can have a ready flashing sight of Krishna's image without entering the temple. After this window was installed, it became customary for all devotees to catch a sight of Krishna's image through this window, before entering the temple.

External links
Udupipages
Potpuri
Dvaita

Hindu temples in Udupi district